Abū Baṣīr (Baseer, Busir), also known as Utbah ibn Baseed, was a contemporary of Muhammad from the Banu Thaqif tribe.

He had fled from Mecca after the Treaty of Hudaybiyyah, away from the Quraysh, and he sought refuge among the Muslims of Medina, but was asked to return since in accordance with Islamic law it was not allowed to break a treaty so he was not accepted. The two men from Quraysh who were pursuing Abu Basir grabbed him and tied him to their caravan to return him back to Mecca. However, Abu Basir managed to escape from the ropes and flee. To his dismay one escaped alive and the next day reached the Muslim caravan demanding Abu Basir to be handed over. Again Muhammad ordered Abu Basir to go with him since he would be a war kindler. Abu Basir understood that he needed to leave and went for the shore, there Abu Jandal ibn Suhayl joined him after freeing himself from the Quraysh in Mecca. Eventually whenever a Muslim escaped Mecca, they joined Abu Basir, until they became a big group.

It is said that Basir was on his deathbed when a letter from Muhammad with permission to return to Medina reached him. He died while holding Muhammad's letter in his hand.

Ibn Hajar al-Asqalani's Fath al-Bari contains one of the more detailed accounts of Abu Basir's life.

References

Sources 
 
 

Companions of the Prophet
People from Mecca